Phaq'u Kiwuta (Aymara  light brown, reddish, blond, dark chestnut,  canine tooth or tusk, -ta a suffix, other spellings Pacokeuta, Paco Keuta, Pakokiuta, Pakokiwuta) is a mountain in the Andes, about 5,589 m (18,337 ft) high. It is situated south-west of the mountain Wila Lluxi, south-east of Warawarani and north of a lake named Quta Thiya in some maps. Other prominent mountains nearby are Jisk'a Pata and Janq'u Uyu in the north, and Wila Lluxita and Mullu Apachita in the north-east, all of them higher than 5,000 m.

See also
 Janq'u Quta
 Kunturiri
 Q'ara Quta
 List of mountains in the Andes

References 

Mountains of La Paz Department (Bolivia)